The twelfth season of Danse avec les stars (the French version of Strictly Come Dancing) premiered in September 2022 on TF1, hosted by Camille Combal.

Around the Show

Host
Camille Combal returns as the host of the show for the fourth year.

Jury
Chris Marques will return as the only remaining judge from previous seasons. as well as Paris Opera dancer François Alu. The third judge will be singer-songwriter and season 11 runner-up Bilal Hassani, replacing Jean Paul Gaultier, and the fourth judge will be Paris Opera ballet dancer Marie-Agnès Gillot replacing Denitsa Ikonomova.

Dancers
Denitsa Ikonomova, 4 Times winner & juror in The previous season, announced her withdrawal due to a busy schedule. Christian Millette, dancer since the third seasom and Maxime Dereymez, dancer since the first season and winner of the second season, Joël Luzolo and Coralie Licata, who debuted in the previous season also announced their departures.

Katrina Patchett, who was absent from the previous season announced her return for season 12 on July 31, 2022.

Marie Denigot who was absent from the previous two seasons announced on August 4, 2022. She was originally planning to return, but ultimately did not because her partner canceled his participation. Frankie Muniz, a comedian who played Malcolm in Malcolm in the Middle and finalist of the twenty-fifth season of the American version in 2017, departed from the series due to health-related problems.

Things To Know
The first week will be pre-recorded and divided in two shows just like last year only 6 contestants will compete for each group
 It means that On September 9 wil be performing : Anggun , Thomas Da Costa , David Douillet, Amandine Petit, Billy Crawford and Eva Queen 
For the second part who will be aired on September 16 are competing : Carla Lazzari,Clémence Castel ,  Florent Peyre , Léa Elui , Stéphane Legar and Théo Fernandez

David Douillet has the second most important difference of height and weight (6 feet 3) and 264 lbs previously Camille Lacourt from Danse avec les stars (season 8) hold that record (6 feet 5 and 187 lbs)

Carla Lazzari became the first female minor contestant to reach the finals

Because Clémence Castel came out in 2021, she will be the first female contestant to dance with a woman.

Anggun and Billy Crawford are the first contestants ever in the whole french franchise show of Asian descent

Anggun was asked to compete on Danse avec les stars (season 6) but refuses 

The older sister of Eva Queen Jazz Correia was supposed to compete on the previous season she will appear as a guest on week 4

Participants

Scoring 

Red numbers indicate couples with the lowest score for each week.
Blue numbers indicate couples with the highest score for each week.
Green numbers indicate couples who did not dance their second dance for each week.
 the couple earned immunity, and could not be eliminated
 indicates couples eliminated that week.
 indicates the returning couple who finished in the bottom two.
 indicates the winning couple.
 indicates the runner-up couple.
 indicates the third place couple.

Averages 
This table only counts dances scored on the traditional 40-point scale.

Highest and lowest scoring performances
The best and worst dance performances according to the judges' marks were, out of 40 points:

Couples' Highest and lowest scoring performances
According to the traditional 40-point scale:

Weekly Scores

Week 1 
 Individual judges scores in the chart below (given in parentheses) appeared in this order from left to right: François Alu, Bilal Hassani, Marie-Agnès Gillot, Chris Marques.

Each juste have a golden buzzer, If each judge buzz for a couple, the couple is immediately qualified for prime 3.

Chris Marques have, in addition of the golden buzzer, a red buzz, if he activates the red buzzer, the couple is immediately in bottom 3.

Running order

Judges' votes to save
Alu: Anggun & Adrien
Hassani: Anggun & Adrien
Gillot: Anggun & Adrien
Marques: Anggun & Adrien

Week 2 
 Individual judges scores in the chart below (given in parentheses) appeared in this order from left to right: Bilal Hassani, Marie-Agnès Gillot, Jean-Marc Généreux, François Alu.

Chris Marques tested positive for COVID-19 two days before the live show. As a result, Jean-Marc Généreux, judge until the Season 10 replace him.
 
Each juste have a golden buzzer, If each judge buzz for a couple, the couple is immediately qualified for prime 3.

Jean-Marc Généreux have, in addition of the golden buzzer, a red buzz, if he activates the red buzzer, the couple is immediately in bottom 3.

Running order

Judges' votes to save
Hassani: Clémence & Candice
Gillot: Clémence & Candice
Généreux: Clémence & Candice
Alu: Théo & Alizée

Week 3 
 Individual judges scores in the chart below (given in parentheses) appeared in this order from left to right: Bilal Hassani, Marie-Agnès Gillot, Chris Marques, François Alu.

The 10 remaining couples are put into 5 duels based on previous weeks, the 1st of prime 1 against the 1st of prime 2 and goes on.

The duels' winners are qualified for prime 4 while losers are in face to face.
Running order

Week 4 
 Individual judges scores in the chart below (given in parentheses) appeared in this order from left to right: Bilal Hassani, Marie-Agnès Gillot, Chris Marques, François Alu.

Each couples dance a part of their routine with one or two guests

The 3 worst scoring couples goes to bottom 3

Running order

Judges' votes to save
Hassani: Eva & Jordan
Gillot: Eva & Jordan
Marques: Léa & Christophe
Alu: Léa & Christophe

Week 5 
 Individual judges scores in the chart below (given in parentheses) appeared in this order from left to right: Bilal Hassani, Marie-Agnès Gillot, Chris Marques, François Alu.

Each couples dance in trio with one of the judge.

The 2 couples of the best scoring team are qualified for prime 6 while all the others are sent in bottom 6.

Christophe Licata being sick & Calisson Goasdoué being injured, are replaced by Jordan Mouillerac & Candice Pascal for This week to dance with Léa Elui & Stéphane Legar.

Barbara Pravi had a special appearance in Carla Lazzari's CV.

Running order

Week 6 
 Individual judges scores in the chart below (given in parentheses) appeared in this order from left to right: Bilal Hassani, Marie-Agnès Gillot, Chris Marques, François Alu.

Each couples discover their music only 15 minutes before performing live, so, they only rehearsed on a metronome.

The 3 worst scoring couples will be in bottom 3.

Calisson Goasdoué being still being injured, is still replaced by Candice Pascal to dance with Stéphane Legar.

Running order

Judges' votes to save
Hassani: Florent & Inès
Gillot: Florent & Inès
Marques: Anggun & Adrien
Alu: Florent & Inès

Week 7 
 Individual judges scores in the chart below (given in parentheses) appeared in this order from left to right: Bilal Hassani, Marie-Agnès Gillot, Chris Marques, François Alu, Denitsa Ikonomova.

This week, a 5th judge give is added to the 4 usual jury-members.

The 2 worst scoring couples will be in bottom 4 directly.

The 4 others got bonus points with chroregraphy challenge and the 2 worst scoring couples in total were send in bottom 4 too.

Calisson Goasdoué being still being injured, is still replaced by Candice Pascal to dance with Stéphane Legar.

Running order

Week 8 

 Individual judges scores in the chart below (given in parentheses) appeared in this order from left to right: Bilal Hassani, Marie-Agnès Gillot, Chris Marques, François Alu.

On the first dance, each couple must beat their highest score of the Season so, 38 for Billy & Fauve, 36 for Stéphane & Calisson, 35 for Carla & Pierre, 31 for Léa & Christophe & 27 for Thomas & Elsa.

On the second dance, each couple must will discover their routine, the music, the costumes, the scenography approximatively 1mn30 before the dance but, if they beat their highest score during the 1st dance, they'll have a 30 seconds bonus to prepare their second dance. At the end, the judge give bonus points to each couple, 5 points for the last, 10, 15, 20 & 25 points for the best.

Calisson Goasdoué come back After 3 weeks being injured.
Christophe Licata being sick, is again replaced by Jordan Mouillerac to dance with Léa Elui.

The 1st by judge's score is qualified while all others are sent in bottom 4

Running order

Week 9 : Semi-final 

 Individual judges scores in the chart below (given in parentheses) appeared in this order from left to right: Bilal Hassani, Marie-Agnès Gillot, Chris Marques, François Alu.

Each couple will be coached all the week by M. Pokora & Katrina Patchett, winning couple of the Season 1 of Danse avec les stars and will impose to each couples one of the figures they did during their journey in season 1 for The first round.

The couple finishing last during the first round is directly send in bottom 3 without doing the second round.
The 2 worst scoring couple for The second round are send in bottom 3.

Running order

Judges' votes to save
Hassani: Stéphane & Calisson
Gillot: Stéphane & Calisson
Marques: Stéphane & Calisson
Alu: Thomas & Elsa

Week 10 : Final 
 Individual judges scores in the chart below (given in parentheses) appeared in this order from left to right: Bilal Hassani, Marie-Agnès Gillot, Chris Marques, François Alu.

David Douillet who was the first contestant eliminated this season will be dancing again in duet with Chris Marques

The last of the 1st dance is directly eliminated.

The 2 last dance weren't noted but the judges choose their favorite dance.

For the last dance, all judges (except Bilal Hassani) choose Billy & Fauve.

Running order

References

Season 12
2022 French television seasons